"On the Rebound" is a 1961 instrumental by pianist Floyd Cramer. In contrast to most of Cramer's work, which consisted mostly of countrypolitan ballads, "On the Rebound" was an uptempo rock and roll instrumental. It made No. 4 in the US and No. 1 in the UK.

Song in Popular Culture
"On the Rebound" was later featured during the opening credits of the 2009 Oscar-nominated film An Education, which was set in England in 1961.

References

External links

1961 singles
Floyd Cramer songs
1960s instrumentals
Song recordings produced by Chet Atkins
Songs written by Floyd Cramer
UK Singles Chart number-one singles
1961 songs
RCA Records singles